Sant'Antonio Abate is an oil on canvas painting by the Italian Baroque painter Mattia Preti, executed c. 1628. It is part of the Collezione M curated by the Fondazione Sorgente Group in Rome, Italy.

Description
The oval painting depicts a half-bust of the eremitic early Christian monk St Anthony Abbot. He is reading a book, and on his shoulder leans his staff with a bell. The elderly man is dressed in a sober dark cloak with hood, setting apart his white beard. The painting has also been described as possibly depicting St Francis of Paola. The dark chiaroscuro betrays the influence of Caravaggio and his followers.

References

1628 paintings
Paintings by Mattia Preti
Paintings in Rome
Paintings of Anthony the Great